Larry Randall McCament (born July 29, 1962) is a retired Major League Baseball pitcher.

McCament attended Grand Canyon University. He was signed as a 15th round pick in the 1985 Major League Baseball Draft by the San Francisco Giants. He was a starter in his first season in pro ball, 1985, going 7-3, but thereafter was a reliever. He spent parts of five seasons in the Texas League and parts of four seasons in the PCL. McCament made his MLB debut in 1989. He pitched in the minor leagues until 1992.

External links

Living people
1962 births
San Francisco Giants players
Major League Baseball pitchers
Grand Canyon Antelopes baseball players
Baseball players from Albuquerque, New Mexico
Everett Giants players
Fresno Giants players
Shreveport Captains players
Phoenix Firebirds players
Las Vegas Stars (baseball) players
San Jose Giants players